Sir James Edward Colebrooke, 1st Baronet (21 July 1722 — 10 May 1761) sat in the House of Commons from 1751 to 1761.

Early life
He was the son of James Colebrooke, of Chilham Castle, Kent, a very prominent private banker in London, and his wife Mary Hudson. He and his brother George were educated at Leiden University; on his return to Britain, he married Mary Skynner, daughter and co-heiress of Stephen Skynner of Walthamstow, Essex, and Mary Remington, in May 1747.

Career
Shortly thereafter he bought Gatton Park from William Newland, with the proprietorship of the borough of Gatton, and the privilege of sending two members to the House of Commons. He duly exercised the privilege, sitting in the House of Commons from 1751 to 1761.

Sir James was invested as a Knight and was created 1st Baronet Colebrooke, of Gatton, county Surrey (Great Britain) on 12 October 1759, with a special remainder to his brother, George. He left two daughters, Emma, Lady Tankerville who was a botanist and Mary (1750–1781), who married Sir John Aubrey, 6th Baronet. On his death in 1761 the baronetcy and Gatton Park passed to his brother George.

Notes

1722 births
1761 deaths
Leiden University alumni
Baronets in the Baronetage of Great Britain
Members of the Parliament of Great Britain for English constituencies
British MPs 1747–1754
British MPs 1754–1761
James